Leonard Oliver Rice (September 2, 1918 – June 13, 1992) was an American  Major League Baseball catcher who played for the Cincinnati Reds (1944) and the Chicago Cubs (1945).

Rice is one of many ballplayers who only appeared in the major leagues during World War II.  He may be most well known for being a reserve catcher on the last Chicago Cubs team to win a National League pennant (1945).  That was his best season, as he got into 32 games and hit .232 (23-for-99) with 7 runs batted in and 10 runs scored.  He had played in just 10 games for the Reds the year before, going 0-for-4, then was drafted by the Cubs from the Reds in the 1944 rule V draft (November 1).

He died at the age of 73 in Sonora, California.

External links 
Baseball Reference
Retrosheet

1918 births
1992 deaths
Major League Baseball catchers
Baseball players from South Dakota
People from Lead, South Dakota
Cincinnati Reds players
Chicago Cubs players